The women's cycling team sprint at the 2019 European Games was held at the Minsk Velodrome on 27 June 2019.

Results

Qualifying

First round
First round heats were held as follows:
Heat 1: 4th v 5th fastest
Heat 2: 3rd v 6th fastest
Heat 3: 2nd v 7th fastest
Heat 4: 1st v 8th fastest

The heat winners were ranked on time, from which the top 2 proceeded to the gold medal final and the other 2 proceeded to the bronze medal final.

Finals

References

Women's team sprint